Jensen Daggett (born June 24, 1969) is an American film and television actress. She has appeared in the films Friday the 13th Part VIII: Jason Takes Manhattan and Major League: Back to the Minors. She had a recurring role as Nancy Taylor in Home Improvement.

Life and career
Daggett was born in Connecticut. After studying theater at Agoura High School in Agoura Hills, California, Daggett moved to Los Angeles after her eighteenth birthday to study at the Stella Adler Conservatory for Acting in Hollywood. At 18 years old, her first acting role was in The Fabulous Baker Boys. Soon after, she portrayed Rennie Wickham in Friday the 13th Part VIII: Jason Takes Manhattan.

She also performed in several dozen television episodes before leaving acting in 1999 to raise a family. Some of her best-known roles were as Nancy Taylor, sister-in-law of Tim Taylor (wife of Tim's younger brother, Marty) on Home Improvement and Charlie in The Single Guy playing Jonathan Silverman's girlfriend.

Her last television appearance was as herself in an episode of the HGTV (Canada) show, Weekend Warriors, in which she remodeled her Connecticut home. Since then she has become a Green Home Builder and has built many homes featured in different magazines.

Select filmography

References

External links

1969 births
Living people
20th-century American actresses
Actresses from California
Actresses from Connecticut
American film actresses
American television actresses
People from Agoura Hills, California
21st-century American women